Oleg Yuryevich Leonov (born 10 September 1970) is a Russian activist and politician. He has been member of the State Duma for Moscow's Central constituency since the 2021 legislative election.

In 2021, Leonov ran for parliament as an independent, however was endorsed by Sergey Sobyanin. In October 2021, Leonov joined the New People parliamentary faction.

Electoral History 

|-
! colspan=2 style="background-color:#E9E9E9;text-align:left;vertical-align:top;" |Candidate
! style="background-color:#E9E9E9;text-align:left;vertical-align:top;" |Party
! style="background-color:#E9E9E9;text-align:right;" |Votes
! style="background-color:#E9E9E9;text-align:right;" |%
|-
|style="background-color: " |
|align=left|Oleg Leonov
|align=left|Independent
|57,505
|26.28%
|-
|style="background-color: " |
|align=left|Sergey Mitrokhin
|align=left|Yabloko
|47,815
|21.85%
|-
|style="background-color: " |
|align=left|Nina Ostanina
|align=left|Communist Party
|22,146
|10.12%
|-
|style="background-color: "|
|align=left|Maksim Shevchenko
|align=left|Russian Party of Freedom and Justice
|13,961
|6.38%
|-
|style="background-color: "|
|align=left|Andrey Shirokov
|align=left|Party of Pensioners
|13,935
|6.37%
|-
|style="background-color: "|
|align=left|Tatyana Vinnitskaya
|align=left|New People
|13,787
|6.30%
|-
|style="background-color: " |
|align=left|Magomet Yandiev
|align=left|A Just Russia — For Truth
|12,979
|5.93%
|-
|style="background-color: " |
|align=left|Dmitry Koshlakov-Krestovsky
|align=left|Liberal Democratic Party
|11,533
|5.28%
|-
|style="background-color: " |
|align=left|Dmitry Zakharov
|align=left|Communists of Russia
|7,411
|3.39%
|-
|style="background: ;"| 
|align=left|Ketevan Kharaidze
|align=left|Green Alternative
|5,745
|2.63%
|-
|style="background-color: " |
|align=left|Yakov Yakubovich
|align=left|Party of Growth
|4,219
|1.93%
|-
|style="background: ;"| 
|align=left|Anatoly Yushin
|align=left|Civic Platform
|2,307
|1.05%
|-
| colspan="5" style="background-color:#E9E9E9;"|
|- style="font-weight:bold"
| colspan="3" style="text-align:left;" | Total
| 218,839
| 100%
|-
| colspan="5" style="background-color:#E9E9E9;"|
|- style="font-weight:bold"
| colspan="4" |Source:
|
|}

References 

Living people
1970 births
Eighth convocation members of the State Duma (Russian Federation)
New People politicians
21st-century Russian politicians
Politicians from Moscow